Kaino Boaz Kipchuma is a Kenyan politician. He belongs to the National Vision Party and was elected to represent the Marakwet West Constituency in the National Assembly of Kenya since the 2007 Kenyan parliamentary election.

References

Living people
Year of birth missing (living people)
Date of birth missing (living people)
Place of birth missing (living people)
Members of the National Assembly (Kenya)
Orange Democratic Movement politicians